Statistics of J. League Cup, officially the '97 J.League Yamazaki Nabisco Cup, in the 1997 season.

Overview
It was contested by 20 teams, and Kashima Antlers won the cup.

Results

Group A

Group B

Group C

Group D

Group E

Quarterfinals
Nagoya Grampus Eight 4–0 ; 1–1 JEF United Ichihara
Consadole Sapporo 1–2 ; 0–7 Kashima Antlers
Urawa Red Diamonds 0–0 ; 2–3 Jubilo Iwata
Yokohama Flugels 0–1 ; 3–0 Kashiwa Reysol

Semifinals
Kashima Antlers 1–0 ; 0–0 Nagoya Grampus Eight
Yokohama Flugels 1–0 ; 0–2 Jubilo Iwata

Final

Jubilo Iwata 1–2 ; 1–5 Kashima Antlers
Kashima Antlers won the cup.

References
rsssf
 J. League

J.League Cup
Lea